Jorge Omar Orrico Miraldi is a Uruguayan deputy, actor and lawyer.

Biography 
Jorge Orrico was born 25 October 1946 in Montevideo.

Acting career 
Orrico acted in theatre plays in the late 1970s and early 1980s. He also acted in the 2001 Uruguayan movie Estrella del Sur, directed by Luis Nieto.

Political career 
Orrico had an early start at the Colorado Party, but then quickly moved to the Broad Front when it was founded in 1971.
He is one of the founders of Uruguay Assembly, a subdivision of the party that he started in 1994 with Danilo Astori.

In 2012 he was chosen President of the Chamber of Deputies of Uruguay.

See also 
Danilo Astori
Tabaré Vázquez
Frente Amplio
Asamblea Uruguay

External links 
Asamblea Uruguay
Frente Amplio
Uruguayan parliament

1946 births
Living people
20th-century Uruguayan lawyers
Colorado Party (Uruguay) politicians
Presidents of the Chamber of Representatives of Uruguay
Uruguay Assembly politicians
Uruguayan actor-politicians
Broad Front (Uruguay) politicians